The Black people of Yarmouk Basin are an Afro-Arab ethnic group in Syria. Most live in southwestern Daraa Governorate.

History 
Though their exact origin is unknown, some local stories report Sudan as ancestral homeland of the Yarmouk Basin's black people; in any case, they have lived in the area for a long time, and are culturally and linguistically assimilated into the local Arab population. While the number of black people in the basin is considered relatively large by locals, their existence is little known throughout wider Syria. In course of the Syrian Civil War, most of the black population of the Yarmouk Basin came under control of the Islamic State of Iraq and the Levant through first the Yarmouk Martyrs Brigade and then the Khalid ibn al-Walid Army.

Population

Geographic distribution 
While a few villages and towns in the Yarmouk Basin have larger black populations, smaller numbers of the ethnic group can be found throughout the whole area.

Known clans 
 Bayt al-Sudi: The largest and best known Black clan of the region, which is centered in the small village of al-Sudi in the northern basin. The Bayt al-Sudi has also a presence in Jamla, Nawa and al-Sheikh Sa'ad (south of Nawa).
 Bayt Abu Samir: A smaller clan in Jamla.
 Bayt Abu Marah: Another clan in Jamla.
 A clan in the village of al-Shajra.
 Larger black populations of unknown tribal affiliation live in Jalin and Tasil.
 Bayt Al-Masri whose name means "Egyptian" in Arabic

See also 
 Zanj
 Afro-Iraqi

Notes

References

Ethnic groups in Syria
African diaspora in the Middle East